Scaphochlamys argentea is a monocotyledonous plant species described by Rosemary Margaret Smith. Scaphochlamys argentea is part of the genus Scaphochlamys and the family Zingiberaceae. No subspecies are listed in the Catalog of Life.

References

argentea
Taxa named by Rosemary Margaret Smith